The Cadillac XT5 (short for Crossover Touring 5) is a compact luxury / D-segment crossover SUV manufactured by General Motors.  It was introduced at both the Dubai Motor Show and LA Auto Show in November 2015.  The XT5 replaced the Cadillac SRX crossover when it was launched in spring 2016.  It is the second model to use Cadillac's new alphanumeric naming scheme (after the CT6) and the first in the Crossover Touring (XT) series.  The XT5 is manufactured at GM's Spring Hill Manufacturing plant. The Chinese-market XT5 is manufactured in Shanghai by SAIC-GM.

 the XT5 was Cadillac's best selling model in the United States and globally.

Overview

The XT5 features technology such as a streaming video rear-view mirror, 360° view backup camera, and the first application in a Cadillac of GM’s Electronic Precision Shift, which replaces the standard hydraulic shifter with an electronic controller.  This, together with a new lightweight chassis, results in a weight savings of  versus the outgoing SRX.

Powertrain
The XT5 was initially available with only one engine, depending on the market.  In the United States, it was a 3.6-liter V6 used in other recent Cadillac models, producing  and  torque.  The V6 includes automatic stop-start and cylinder deactivation to improve fuel economy.  In China, the XT5 is powered by a turbocharged 2.0-liter 4-cylinder engine producing an estimated  and  torque.  The XT5 is available in both front-wheel drive and all-wheel drive. The AWD system, provided by GKN Driveline, is completely new for this model and utilizes features like twin-clutch differential at rear axle with active torque vectoring, allowing the system to distribute 100% of torque to either front or rear axle as well as to either left or right rear wheel. In an addition to that, the AWD system allows the driver to disconnect the rear drive unit and leave the car in FWD mode for improved fuel efficiency.

Trim levels
The 2017 XT5 is offered in four trim levels.  Above the base XT5 are "Luxury", "Premium Luxury" and range topping "Platinum". The base price of the entry front-wheel drive 2017 XT5 at launch was $38,995 in the United States.

2020 update
For the 2020 model year, the XT5 received several mid-cycle updates.  The trim levels changed to Cadillac's "Y" strategy, with Luxury as the base, and Premium Luxury and Sport as separate higher levels.  The exterior design received only minor changes, with a new bright metallic patterned grille on the Premium Luxury, and a new darker grille on the Sport.

GM's newest 2.0 L turbocharged I4 engine, producing  and  torque, replaced the previous engine in China, and became the new base engine in the North American market, joining the V6.  A new rotary controller for the Cadillac CUE system was added, along with updates to the rear camera mirror and electronic precision shifter.

Other uses
With the demise of the Cadillac XTS in 2019, the XT5 is now going to be Cadillac's platform for funeral coaches, available through GM's approved coachbuilders.

Sales

References

External links

XT5
Cars introduced in 2016
Luxury crossover sport utility vehicles
2020s cars